Domenico Gargiulo called Micco Spadaro ( – ) was an Italian painter of the Baroque period, mainly active in Naples and known for his landscapes, genre scenes, and history paintings.

Life
Domenico Gargiulo was the son of a sword maker.  This earned Domenico the nickname 'Micco Spadaro' ('spadaro' means 'sword maker'). He was trained in the workshop of the battle-painter Aniello Falcone, where he was a contemporary of Andrea di Leone and Salvator Rosa. He also worked with Viviano Codazzi, to whose architectural paintings he added the figures.

His early works were influenced by Paul Bril whose works he must have known from Bril's 1602 landscape frescoes in the atrium of S Maria Regina Coeli in Naples.  He was also influenced by Filippo Napoletano.

Among his pupils were Pietro Pesce and Ignazio Oliva. He was patronized by collectors such as Gaspar Roomer. He also worked in the Certosa di San Martino, where he painted in the Coro dei Conversi and Quarto del priori. He painted a representation of the insurrection by Masaniello and of the plague of 1656.

References

Bibliography

External links

1600s births
1670s deaths
17th-century Neapolitan people
17th-century Italian painters
Italian male painters
Painters from Naples
Italian Baroque painters